BC Castors Braine (English: Basketball Club Braine Beavers)  is a basketball club, with both men's and women's sections, based in the municipality of Braine-l'Alleud, Belgium. The women's team plays in the National First Division and won the title in 2014. The men's team plays in the provincial division.

History
The club was founded in 1939.

The men's team participated in the Korać Cup in 1987–88, 1990–91 and 1996–97.

The women's team reached the national first division in 2011. In 2014, the female Castors Braine squad won the national championship and the national cup. They followed the title by being runners-up in the 2014–15 EuroCup Women, the first Belgian team to reach a European final. Castors Braine has since won the next four Belgian championships, winning the Belgian Cup as well in 2015 and 2017, with BC Namur-Capitale taking the title instead.

The 2019–20 season was finished prematurely because of the COVID-19 pandemic. Castors were named champions for the fifth straight time because the team was highest in the standings at the time.

Current roster

Honours
Belgian Women's Basketball League
Champions (7): 2014, 2015, 2016, 2017, 2018, 2019, 2020

References

External links

 
 EuroCup Women 2015 profile at FIBA website

Basketball teams established in 1939
Basketball teams in Belgium
Sport in Walloon Brabant
1939 establishments in Belgium